Thomas Henderson Mount  (born 26 May 1948) is a former President of Universal Pictures.

Born in Durham, North Carolina, he studied art at Bard College where he received a BA. He received an MFA in Film and Video at the California Institute of the Arts.

Starting as assistant to Executive VP Ned Tanen in 1972 Mount rose quickly through the MCA/Universal ranks to become Universal President in 1975 through early 1985. There he developed, supervise, financed and distributed over 200 features.

After leaving Universal in late 1984, Mount founded his own company, which produced acclaimed films like 
Bull Durham, 
Tequila Sunrise, 
Frantic, 
Natural Born Killers, 
Can't Buy Me Love, 
The Indian Runner, 
Night Falls on Manhattan, and 
Death and the Maiden, 
which he first produced on stage in London's West End and on Broadway. Although The Mount Company had outgoing agreements with various film studios like Warner Bros., Tri-Star Pictures, The Walt Disney Studios and Lorimar Motion Pictures, on June 11, 1986, The Mount Company received a three-year, two-picture-a-year, non-exclusive deal with Columbia Pictures, in order that Mount would develop projects for the studio. 
  
Mount is a co-founder of the Los Angeles Film School, two-term president of the Producers Guild of America, and has been a consultant for RKO Pictures.

He has been an active Academy member since 1977.

Frequently rumored to be the model for Robert Altman's The Player, Mount said "Not me. I've never murdered a screenwriter".

Filmography
He was a producer in all films unless otherwise noted.

Film

Thanks

Television

References

External links
 
 
 

Living people
Businesspeople from Durham, North Carolina
American film producers
NBCUniversal people
American film studio executives
Bard College alumni
California Institute of the Arts alumni
1948 births